Selenoprotein S, also known as SELS, is a human gene.

This gene encodes a selenoprotein, which contains a selenocysteine (Sec) residue at its active site. The selenocysteine is encoded by the UGA codon that normally signals translation termination. The 3' UTR of selenoprotein genes have a common stem-loop structure, the sec insertion sequence (SECIS), that is necessary for the recognition of UGA as a Sec codon rather than as a stop signal. Studies suggest that this protein may regulate cytokine production, and thus play a key role in the control of the inflammatory response. Two alternatively spliced transcript variants encoding the same protein have been found for this gene.

Interactions
SELS (gene) has been shown to interact with Valosin-containing protein.

References

Further reading

Selenoproteins